The following is a list of the capitals of the provinces of South Africa.

References
 

capitals
South African provincial capitals